In Greek mythology, Anchiroe (Ancient Greek: Αγχιροη Ankhiroê means "pouring flow") may refer to the following figures:

 Anchiroe, also Anchirhoe (Ἀγχιρόης), an Arcadian nymph who together with other nymphs, Neda, Anthracia, Hagno and Myrtoessa, were nurses of the god Zeus. She was depicted to carry water-pots with what is meant to be water coming down from her.
 Anchiroe, one of the Erasinides, Argive naiad daughters of the river-god Erasinus. She and her sisters, Byze, Maera and Melite, received Britomartis.
 Anchiroe, daughter of the river god Chremetes, wife of Psyllus, the man who made war against Notus, and mother by him of Crataigonos, a Libyan who joined Dionysus in his Indian campaign.
Anchiroe or Achiroe, daughter of Nilus and wife of Belus.
Anchiroe, consort of Sithon.

Notes

References 

 Antoninus Liberalis, The Metamorphoses of Antoninus Liberalis translated by Francis Celoria (Routledge 1992). Online version at the Topos Text Project.
 Apollodorus, The Library with an English Translation by Sir James George Frazer, F.B.A., F.R.S. in 2 Volumes, Cambridge, MA, Harvard University Press; London, William Heinemann Ltd. 1921. ISBN 0-674-99135-4. Online version at the Perseus Digital Library. Greek text available from the same website.
Nonnus of Panopolis, Dionysiaca translated by William Henry Denham Rouse (1863–1950), from the Loeb Classical Library, Cambridge, MA, Harvard University Press, 1940.  Online version at the Topos Text Project.
 Nonnus of Panopolis, Dionysiaca. 3 Vols. W.H.D. Rouse. Cambridge, MA., Harvard University Press; London, William Heinemann, Ltd. 1940–1942. Greek text available at the Perseus Digital Library.
 Pausanias, Description of Greece with an English Translation by W.H.S. Jones, Litt.D., and H.A. Ormerod, M.A., in 4 Volumes. Cambridge, MA, Harvard University Press; London, William Heinemann Ltd. 1918. . Online version at the Perseus Digital Library
Pausanias, Graeciae Descriptio. 3 vols. Leipzig, Teubner. 1903.  Greek text available at the Perseus Digital Library.

Naiads
Nymphs
Arcadian characters in Greek mythology
Argive characters in Greek mythology
Egyptian characters in Greek mythology
Mythology of Argolis
Arcadian mythology
Egyptian mythology